Hitchcock is a surname. Notable people with the surname include:

 Alf Hitchcock (1958–2017), British police officer
 Alfred Hitchcock (1899–1980), English film director
 Almeda Eliza Hitchcock (1863–1895), Hawaii lawyer
 A. S. Hitchcock (1865–1935), American botanist and agrostologist
 Billy Hitchcock (1916–2006), American baseball player
 Carol Hitchcock (b. 1959), Australian singer 
 Charles B. Hitchcock (died 1875), American politician
 Charles Henry Hitchcock (1836–1919), American geologist
 Charles Leo Hitchcock (1902–1986), American botanist
 Daniel Hitchcock (1739–1777), American military officer
 Daniel Hitchcock (politician) (1908–1996) (Tasmania), Australian member of the Tasmanian Legislative Council   
 Dave Hitchcock, English former record producer
 David Hitchcock (comics writer), an English comics writer and artist
 David Howard Hitchcock (1861–1943), an American/Hawaiian painter
 Edward Hitchcock (1793–1864), President of Amherst College and geologist
 Edward Griffin Hitchcock (1837–1898), Marshal of Hawaii 
 Ethan A. Hitchcock (general) (1798–1870), U.S. Army general
 Ethan A. Hitchcock (Interior) (1835–1909), United States Secretary of the Interior
 Frank H. Hitchcock (1867–1935), American politician and Postmaster General
 Frank Lauren Hitchcock (1875–1957), American mathematician and physicist
 George Hitchcock (artist) (1850–1913), American artist
 George B. Hitchcock (1812–1872), American abolitionist
 George Hitchcock (poet) (1914–2010), U.S. poet and publisher of "Kayak" magazine
 Gilbert Hitchcock (1859–1934), U.S. Representative and Senator from Nebraska
 Harvey Rexford Hitchcock (1800–1855), American missionary to Hawaii
 Henry Hitchcock (1792–1839), first Attorney General of Alabama
 Henry-Russell Hitchcock (1903–1987), American architectural historian
 Henry Smith Hitchcock (died 1929), Australian aircraft mechanic
 Herbert E. Hitchcock (1867–1958), U.S. Senator from South Dakota
 Jeremy Hitchcock (born 1981), American Internet company CEO
 Jimmy Hitchcock (1911–1959), American football and baseball player
 Jimmy Hitchcock (cornerback) (born 1970), American football player
 Karen R. Hitchcock (1943–2019), Principal and Vice-Chancellor of Queen's University, Kingston, Ontario
 Ken Hitchcock (born 1951), NHL coach
 Kevin Hitchcock (born 1962), English goalkeeper 
 Lambert Hitchcock (1795–1852), American furniture designer
 Margaret Hitchcock (1883–1967), nurse from New Zealand who served in France in World War I
 Mary Evelyn Hitchcock (1849–1920), American author, traveler
 Michael Hitchcock (born 1958), American actor, comedian, screenwriter, and television producer
 Michael Hitchcock (Brooklyn Nine-Nine), fictional character
 Nicola Hitchcock, British singer, songwriter and record producer
 Nigel Hitchcock (born 1971), English jazz saxophonist
 Patricia Hitchcock (1928–2021), actress and daughter of Alfred Hitchcock
 Paul Hitchcock (born 1975), New Zealand cricketer
 Peter Hitchcock (1781–1853) Chief Justice, Ohio Supreme Court
 Phineas Hitchcock (1831–1881) U.S. Senator from Nebraska
 Ray Hitchcock (born 1965), American football player
 Raymond Hitchcock (actor) (1865–1929), American stage and screen actor
 Raymond Hitchcock (author) (1922–1992), English novelist and screenwriter
 Raymond Hitchcock (cricketer) (1929–2019), New Zealand cricketer 
 Ripley Hitchcock (1857–1918), a prominent American editor
 Robert Hitchcock (born 1944), Australian sculptor
 Robert Hitchcock (dramatist) (died 1809), English dramatist
 Robyn Hitchcock (born 1953), English singer/songwriter
 Rufus Wilber Hitchcock (1868–1961), American educator, newspaper publisher, and politician
 Roswell Dwight Hitchcock (1817–1887), American theologian
 Russell Hitchcock (born 1949), Australian vocalist from Air Supply
 Simon C. Hitchcock (c. 1801–1878), New York politician
 Sterling Hitchcock (born 1971), American baseball pitcher
 Sylvia Hitchcock (1946–2015), 1967 Miss Universe 
 Tommy Hitchcock (1860–1941), American polo player and horse trainer
 Tommy Hitchcock Jr. (1900–1944), American WWI & WWII pilot, American polo player
 Warren Billingsley Hitchcock (1919–1984), Australian ornithologist
 Rex Ingram (director), born Reginald Ingram Montgomery Hitchcock (1892–1950), Irish film director, producer, writer, and actor

See also
 Justice Hitchcock (disambiguation)

English-language surnames